("new peso") may refer to:

Mexican nuevo peso, denomination of currency in circulation in Mexico from January 1, 1993 to January 1, 1996.
Uruguayan nuevo peso, currency in circulation in Uruguay from November 1975 to March 1, 1993.